Högström is a surname. Notable people with the surname include:

Elisabeth Högström (born 1951), Swedish curler
Georg Högström (1895–1976), Swedish pole vaulter
Leif Högström (born 1955), Swedish fencer
Marcus Högström (born 1989), Swedish ice hockey player
Tomas Högström (born 1954), Swedish politician
Torvald Högström (1926-2010), Finnish cyclist